The LCDR T class was a class of  steam locomotives of the London, Chatham and Dover Railway. The class was designed by William Kirtley and introduced in 1879.

Numbering
Source: semgonline

Notes
 Sources differ as to whether 1603 or 1604 entered BR ownership
 Number 607 was transferred to the Service Department and numbered 500 S.

Ownership changes
The locomotives passed to the South Eastern and Chatham Railway in 1899. All 10 (SECR nos. 600-609) survived into Southern Railway ownership in 1923. Three survived into British Railways (BR) ownership in 1948. They had all been withdrawn by 1951.

Withdrawal
Seven locomotives had been withdrawn by 1948. The remaining 3 were withdrawn as follows:
 D500 S in November 1949 from Meldon Quarry
 31603 in November 1950 from Reading South shed (shed code 70E)
 31602 in July 1951 from Reading South shed (shed code 70E)

None were preserved.

References

T
0-6-0T locomotives
Railway locomotives introduced in 1879
Scrapped locomotives
Railway Operating Division locomotives
Standard gauge steam locomotives of Great Britain